''Haplochromis'' sp. 'Migori' is a species of fish in the family Cichlidae. It is endemic to Kenya.  Its natural habitat is rivers.

References

Haplochromis
Endemic freshwater fish of Kenya
Undescribed vertebrate species
Taxonomy articles created by Polbot